Kenneth Casey (January 10, 1899 – August 10, 1965) was an American composer, publisher, author, and child movie star in early silents.

Biography
Born in New York City, Casey worked as a child actor in over thirty films for Vitagraph Studios between the years 1909 and 1913.  He appeared with a young Moe Howard in the 1909 picture We Must Do Our Best.  Howard later became famous as one of The Three Stooges.

As a songwriter, Casey is best remembered for writing the lyrics to "Sweet Georgia Brown" in 1925.

Filmography

 We Must Do Our Best, directed by Van Dyke Brooke (1909)
 Mario's Swan Song (1910)
 Over the Garden Wall (1910)
 Chew Chew Land; or, The Adventures of Dolly and Jim (1910)
 Two Waifs and a Stray (1910)
 A Lunatic at Large (1910)
 Ransomed; or, A Prisoner of War (1910)
 The Children's Revolt (1910)
 Jean Goes Fishing (1910)
 Drumsticks (1910)
 A Tin-Type Romance (1910)
 The Misses Finch and Their Nephew Billy (1911)
 Consuming Love; or, St. Valentine's Day in Greenaway Land (1911)
 A Tale of Two Cities (1911)
 Mammy's Ghost (1911)
 A Little Lad in Dixie (1911)
 The Derelict Reporter (1911)
 Hungry Hearts; or, The Children of Social Favorites (1911)
 The Show Girl (1911)
 Barriers Burned Away (1911)
 The Clown's Best Performance (1911)
 The Long Skirt (1911)
 Cherry Blossoms (1911)
 The Child Crusoes (1911)
 Daddy's Boy and Mammy (1911)
 Wig Wag (1911)
 The Little Spy (1911)
 Captain Jenks' Dilemma (1912)
 How Tommy Saved His Father (1912)
 Father and Son (1912)
 Tom Tilling's Baby (1912)
 A Story of the Circus (1912)
 The Black Wall (1912)
 The Old Silver Watch (1912)
 The Man Under the Bed  (1912)
 An Innocent Theft (1912)
 Fate's Awful Jest (1912)
 A Juvenile Love Affair (1912)
 Ingenuity (1912)
 Vultures and Doves (1912)
 Bumps (1912)
 The Higher Mercy, directed by William V. Ranous (1912)
 Three Girls and a Man, directed by Albert W. Hale (1912)
 The Eavesdropper, directed by James Young (1912)
 When Bobby Forgot, directed by Laurence Trimble (1913)
 Cutey and the Twins, directed by James Young (1913)
 The White Slave; or, The Octoroon, directed by James Young (1913)
 The Feudists, directed by Wilfrid North (1913)
 In the Shadow, directed by James Lackaye (1913)
 Heartease, directed by L. Rogers Lytton e James Young (1913)
 The Adventurer, directed by J. Gordon Edwards (1920)

References

Bibliography 
John Holmstrom, The Moving Picture Boy: An International Encyclopaedia from 1895 to 1995, Norwich, Michael Russell, 1996, pp. 12–13.

External links

1899 births
1965 deaths
American male film actors
American male silent film actors
American male child actors
Male actors from New York City
20th-century American male actors
20th-century American musicians